Argyrotaenia floridana is a species of moth of the family Tortricidae. It is found in the United States, where it has been recorded from Alabama, Arkansas, Florida, Kentucky, Louisiana, Maryland, Mississippi, New Jersey, North Carolina, Ohio, South Carolina, Tennessee, and Texas.

The length of the forewings is 5.5 mm for males and 7.5–9 mm for females. The forewings are grayish-white, but the basal area is brown, mixed with ferruginous. The hindwings are pale brownish ocherous, but whitish basad (toward the base). Adults have been recorded on wing year-round.

References

F
Moths of North America
Moths described in 1961